Kaun Banegi Shikharwati is an Indian Hindi-language comedy-drama original web series streaming on ZEE5. It is written and directed by Gauravv Chawla and Ananya Banerjee. The series has been produced by Applause Entertainment & Emmay Entertainment. This ten-episode web series was released on 7 January 2022. It stars Naseeruddin Shah, Raghubir Yadav, Lara Dutta, Soha Ali Khan, Kritika Kamra and Anya Singh in the lead roles.

Plot 
It is the story of Raja Mrityunjay Singh Shikharwat, who is broke and owes the Indian government a hefty amount of in unpaid property taxes. To come out of this scenario, he fakes sickness and summons his four estranged daughters, Devyani, Gayatri, Kamini, and Uma. He plans to hold a nine-rounds tournament amongst them, each with a job for the princesses to complete. At the end of this tournament, the winner will be crowned Queen.

Cast 

 Naseeruddin Shah as Raja Mrityunjay Singh Shikharwat
 Raghubir Yadav as Mishraji
 Lara Dutta as Devyani Shikharwat Goel
 Soha Ali Khan as Gayatri Shikharwat
 Kritika Kamra as Kamini Shikharwat
 Anya Singh as Uma Shikharwat
 Cyrus Sahukar as Harsh Goel
 Varun Thakur as Roop Singh
 Anurag Sinha as Veer Singh
 Norshang Tamang as Dhanur
 Alisha as Padma
 Dino Morea
 Sahil Salathia

Episode list

Release 
ZEE5 announced the launch of a trailer on 23 December 2021 and the series was released on 7 January 2022.

Reception

Critical reviews 
Archika Khurana of The Times of India has given 3.5/5 stars stating that the series is a fun, breezy take on a dysfunctional royal family. Due to its simple writing and weird characters, it is a fine blend of humour and drama. Do not be fooled by the tracksuit and games; the series is not as gory as ‘Squid Game’, but it is a light-hearted dramedy that will bring a smile to your face.

Saibal Chatterjee of NDTV has given 2.5/5 stars stating that the series is a patchy dramedy. It is a mildly diverting, inoffensive parody of the repercussions of power wielded without responsibility. It does not scale any peak, but it is entertaining enough not to sink into a low work that it cannot find its way out of with a little bit of help from the actors.

Shubham Kulkarni of Koimoi has given 2/5 stars stating that the series is a dramedy about a dysfunctional family that falls prey to repetitiveness and confused tonality. The actor Naseeruddin Shah is prolific, but the character becomes repetitive. All the other actors have made justice to their respective roles. The web series like this with more evolved humour deserved depth too. The bar for dramedies about families raised four decades ago by some prolific filmmakers will struggle to live up to them.

References

External links 
 Kaun Banegi Shikharwati at ZEE5
 

Hindi-language web series
2022 web series debuts
ZEE5 original programming
Indian comedy web series
Indian drama web series
Comedy-drama web series